Scopula subrubellata is a moth of the family Geometridae. It is found in Turkmenistan.

References

Moths described in 1941
subrubellata
Moths of Asia